Miroslav Kusý (1 December 1931 – 13 February 2019) was a Slovak political scientist and politician.  Described as a "dissident" of Czechoslovakia's communist regime, he was given an eight-month suspended sentence in November 1989 for an anti-government protest. After the Velvet Revolution, Kusý was appointed as chairman of the Federal Press and Information Office of Czechoslovakia.

After politics, Kusý became a professor in political science.

He died on 13 February 2019, at age of 87 from heart failure.

References

1931 births
2019 deaths
Charter 77 signatories
Politicians from Bratislava
Recipients of the Order of Tomáš Garrigue Masaryk
People of the Velvet Revolution
Slovak political scientists